The Illsley Place–West Rudisill Historic District is a national historic district in Fort Wayne, Indiana. The district encompasses 63 buildings and 1 structure in a predominantly residential section of Fort Wayne. The area was developed from about 1887 to 1955 and includes notable examples of the Colonial Revival, Tudor Revival, Bungalow / American Craftsman, and Italianate styles of residential architecture.

It was listed on the National Register of Historic Places in 2006.

References

Houses on the National Register of Historic Places in Indiana
Historic districts on the National Register of Historic Places in Indiana
Colonial Revival architecture in Indiana
Tudor Revival architecture in Indiana
Italianate architecture in Indiana
National Register of Historic Places in Fort Wayne, Indiana
Houses in Fort Wayne, Indiana
2006 establishments in Indiana